Kristel de Catalina (born June 29, 1985 in Antipolo, Rizal, Philippines) is a Filipino dancer and actress. She was the sixth grand winner of Pilipinas Got Talent franchise along with Julius Obrero, Rhea Marquez & Joven Olvido.

Personal life 
She was born and raised in Antipolo, Rizal. She is known for winning the 2017 Air Stars, Asian Aerial Dance Art Competition. Later she auditioned in PGT 6.

Filmography

Film 
 Supahpapalicious - 2008, (cameo role)

See also 
 Pilipinas Got Talent (season 6)
 Jovit Baldivino
 Marcelito Pomoy
 Maasinhon Trio
 Power Duo

References

External links 
 

1985 births
Living people
Filipino film actresses
Filipino female dancers
Got Talent winners
People from Antipolo
Actresses from Rizal
Tagalog people
Pilipinas Got Talent contestants
Reality show winners